The 2008 World Outdoor Bowls Championship women's singles was held at the Burnside Bowling Club in Christchurch, New Zealand, from 12 to 24 January 2008.

Val Smith won the women's singles gold medal.

Section tables

Section A

Section B

Finals

Results

References

Bowls
Wom
World